Lugaritz is a railway station in San Sebastián, Basque Country, Spain. It is owned by Euskal Trenbide Sarea and operated by Euskotren. It lies on the Bilbao-San Sebastián line and is also served by the suburban Topo service.

History 
The new underground loop through the city center will start to the north of this station.

Services 
The station is served by Euskotren Trena lines E1 and E2. Line E2 runs every 15 minutes (in each direction) during weekdays, and every 30 minutes during weekends. Line E1 runs every 30 minutes (in each direction) during weekdays, and every hour during weekends.

References

External links
 

Euskotren Trena stations
Railway stations in San Sebastián
Railway stations in Spain opened in 2005
2005 establishments in the Basque Country (autonomous community)